Rend Lake State Fish and Wildlife Area is an Illinois state park on  in Franklin and Jefferson Counties, United States.

References

State parks of Illinois
Protected areas of Jefferson County, Illinois
Protected areas of Franklin County, Illinois